Bahaa Magdi (born 14 February 1989) is an Egyptian footballer who currently plays for Al Masry in the Egyptian Premier League as a left back.

Honours
Zamalek SC

 Saudi-Egyptian Super Cup: 2018
 CAF Confederation Cup : 2018–19

References

External links
 

1989 births
Living people
Egyptian footballers
Association football defenders
El Qanah FC players
Ismaily SC players
Zamalek SC players
Egyptian Premier League players
People from Ismailia